The Itivuttaka (Pali for "as it was said") is a Buddhist scripture, part of the Pali Canon of Theravada Buddhism and is attributed to Khujjuttara's recollection of Buddha's discourses. It is included there in the Sutta Pitaka's Khuddaka Nikaya. It comprises 112 short teachings ascribed in the text to the Buddha, each consisting of a prose portion followed by a verse portion. The latter may be a paraphrase of the former, or complementary. Some scholars consider it one of the earliest of all Buddhist scriptures, while others consider it somewhat later.  Latest translation by Samanera Mahinda has been published in 2018.

Translations 
 Sayings of Buddha, tr J. H. Moore, Columbia University Press, 1908
 "As it was said", in Minor Anthologies of the Pali Canon, volume II, tr F. L. Woodward, 1935, Pali Text Society, Bristol
 Tr John D. Ireland, Buddhist Publication Society, Kandy, Sri Lanka, 1991; later reprinted in 1 volume with his translation of the Udana.
 Tr Peter Masefield, 2000, Pali Text Society, Bristol; the PTS's preferred translation; its declared aim is to translate in accordance with the commentary's interpretation
 Tr Bhikkhu Mahinda (Anagarika Mahendra), Itivuttaka: Book of This Was Said, Bilingual Pali-English Second Edition 2022, Dhamma Publishers, Roslindale MA;  .

See also 
 Khujjuttara

Notes

External links 
 Itivuttaka by Sāmaṇera Mahinda
 selected Itivuttaka suttas
 This was said by the Buddha

Khuddaka Nikaya